Vicente Vega (born 21 February 1955) is a Venezuelan footballer. He played in nine matches for the Venezuela national football team from 1975 to 1983. He was also part of Venezuela's squad for the 1975 Copa América tournament.

References

External links
 

1955 births
Living people
Venezuelan footballers
Venezuela international footballers
Association football goalkeepers
Deportivo Táchira F.C. players
Portuguesa F.C. players
Deportivo Italia players